If You Leave Me Now is a compilation album by the rock band Chicago. In an attempt to capitalize on the band's second #1 single ("Hard to Say I'm Sorry") as well as its Top 40 follow-up ("Love Me Tomorrow"), Columbia Records built a collection around the Grammy-winning single, which had previously been their only other chart-topper.

Since Columbia was the owner of the recordings at the time, this is an official release, but has never been considered a proper part of their numbered canon of works. While the practice of repackaging older works when an artist has a resurgence with another label is not new, it is almost always frowned upon, as demonstrated in William Ruhlmann's review at AllMusic: "At least a few people will mistake it for new product and take it home".

Track listing

 The CD version of Chicago's Greatest Hits restored some of the edited intro to "Does Anybody Really Know What Time It Is?", making this the only source of the original Greatest Hits edit available on compact disc.

In 2012, Rhino reissued it yet again, with "(And Other Hits)" added in its title.

References

1983 greatest hits albums
Chicago (band) compilation albums
Albums produced by James William Guercio
Albums produced by Phil Ramone
Albums produced by Tom Dowd
Columbia Records compilation albums